The canton of Les Hautes Terres d'Oc is an administrative division of the Tarn department, southern France. It was created at the French canton reorganisation which came into effect in March 2015. Its seat is in Lacaune.

It consists of the following communes:
 
Anglès
Barre
Berlats
Le Bez
Brassac
Cambounès
Escroux
Espérausses
Fontrieu
Gijounet
Lacaune
Lacaze
Lacrouzette
Lamontélarié
Lasfaillades
Le Masnau-Massuguiès
Moulin-Mage
Murat-sur-Vèbre
Nages
Saint-Pierre-de-Trivisy
Saint-Salvi-de-Carcavès
Senaux
Vabre
Viane

References

Cantons of Tarn (department)